Thomas Humphrey Cushing (December 20, 1755 – October 19, 1822) was an officer in the Continental Army, and later the United States Army. A veteran of the American Revolutionary War and the War of 1812, he attained the rank of brigadier general. He later served as collector of customs for the Port of New London, Connecticut.

Early life
Thomas H. Cushing was born in Pembroke, Massachusetts on December 20, 1755, a son of Nehemiah Cushing (1721–1762) and Sarah (Humphrey) Cushing (1722–1804). Nehemiah Cushing was serving the British as a captain in the Massachusetts Militia during the French and Indian War when he died at Crown Point, New York. Sarah Humphrey Cushing married Isaac Hatch in 1763; according to local lore, she attended the ceremony clad in a petticoat to take advantage of an English custom, "smock marriage," by which a widow indicated she brought no property into her new marriage. A smock marriage prevented creditors from attempting to collect the deceased husband's debts from the widow or her new husband; according to the Cushing family historian, Sarah Cushing maintained her modesty by wearing her petticoat over her dress. Cushing was raised and educated in Pembroke, then supported the Patriot side in the American Revolution by joining the Continental Army.

American Revolution
Cushing began his military career as a sergeant in the 6th Continental Regiment in January 1776. He was commissioned a second lieutenant in the 1st Massachusetts Regiment in January 1777 and was promoted to first lieutenant in January 1778. He was taken prisoner in May 1781 and was later exchanged. He received a brevet promotion to captain in September 1783. Cushing was admitted to the Society of the Cincinnati as an original member later that year.

Following the British evacuation of New York City in November 1783, the bulk of the Continental Army was discharged. Cushing was retained in Jackson's Continental Regiment, commanded by Brevet Brigadier General Henry Jackson, and was one of the last officers to be discharged from the Continental Army when the regiment was disbanded on June 20, 1784.

Later career
On March 4, 1791 Cushing was commissioned a captain in the 2nd Infantry Regiment. On March 3, 1793 he was commissioned as a major in the 1st Sublegion (later re-designated as the 1st Infantry Regiment).

From February 27, 1797 to May 22, 1798 he served as Adjutant and Inspector General of the Army. In 1799, he commissioned artist James Peale to create a miniature portrait of himself. On June 15, 1800 he was re-appointed as Adjutant and Inspector General and held the office until April 2, 1807. From 1800 to 1807 he resided in Washington, D.C.

Cushing was promoted to lieutenant colonel of the 2nd Infantry on April 1, 1802. He was promoted to colonel of the same regiment on September 7, 1805.

In early 1811, Cushing was arrested on the order of Brigadier General Wade Hampton I and court-martialed on charges of disobedience to orders and misuse of government funds. The court first met on April 26, 1811 in Baton Rouge, Louisiana and was presided over by Colonel Alexander Smyth, with Winfield Scott appointed as the judge advocate (prosecutor). The trial lasted over a year and on May 5, 1812, Cushing was acquitted of most charges, and received only a written reprimand for the minor charges of which he was convicted.

War of 1812
Cushing was promoted to the rank of brigadier general on July 2, 1812.  During the War of 1812, he served as Adjutant General of the Army from July 6, 1812 to March 12, 1813.  He was then assigned as commander of Military District Number 1 (consisting of the states of Massachusetts and New Hampshire) with his headquarters at Boston.

After the war's end, he retired from the Army on June 15, 1815.

Later life
In January 1816 Cushing was appointed collector of customs for the port of New London, Connecticut, succeeding Jedediah Huntington.

In 1817, Cushing fought a duel with Virginia congressman William J. Lewis and was saved when the bullet struck his watch. The two resolved their differences, and Lewis, stepping up to the general, said: "I congratulate you, general, on having a watch that will keep time from eternity."

Cushing died in New London in 1822.  He was originally buried in the Second Burial Ground in New London but his remains were later relocated to the Cedar Grove Cemetery in the same city.

Dates of rank
Sergeant, 6th Continental Infantry - 1 January 1776
2nd Lieutenant, 1st Massachusetts Regiment - 1 January 1777
1st Lieutenant, 1st Massachusetts Regiment - 12 January 1778
Brevet Captain - 30 September 1783
1st Lieutenant, Jackson's Continental Regiment - November 1783
Discharged - 20 June 1784
Captain, 2nd Infantry - 4 March 1791
Captain, 2nd Sub-Legion - 4 September 1792
Major, 1st Sub-Legion - 3 March 1793
Major, 1st Infantry - 1 November 1796
Lieutenant Colonel, 2nd Infantry - 1 April 1802
Colonel, 2nd Infantry - 7 September 1805
Brigadier General, United States Army - 2 July 1812
Retired - 15 June 1815

See also
List of Adjutant Generals of the U.S. Army
List of Inspectors General of the U.S. Army

Further reading

Notes

References

Sources

External links

Thomas H. Cushing at Find a Grave
 The Society of the Cincinnati
 The American Revolution Institute

1755 births
1822 deaths
People from Pembroke, Massachusetts
Adjutants general of the United States Army
People from Massachusetts in the War of 1812
Continental Army officers from Massachusetts
Inspectors General of the United States Army
United States Army generals
Burials at Cedar Grove Cemetery (New London, Connecticut)